The Roman Catholic Diocese of David (erected 6 March 1955) is a suffragan diocese of the Archdiocese of Panamá. The diocese was founded in March 1955. The cathedral church is the Catedral de San José, Chiriquí.
The current bishop is Cardinal José Luis Lacunza Maestrojuán.

Gallery

Bishops

Ordinaries
Tomas Alberto Clavel Méndez (1955–1964), appointed Archbishop of Panamá
Daniel Enrique Núñez Núñez (1964–1999)
José Luis Lacunza Maestrojuán, O.A.R. (1999– ), elevated to Cardinal in 2015

Coadjutor bishop
Carlos Ambrosio Lewis Tullock, S.V.D. (1986-1994), did not succeed to see

Territorial losses

See also
Catholic Church in Panama

References

External links
 

David
David
David
1955 establishments in Panama
Roman Catholic Ecclesiastical Province of Panamá